Adiz or variation, may refer to:

 Ädiz clan, the second imperial clan of the Uyghur Khaganate
 Air defense identification zone, a type of airspace
 Air Defense Identification Zone (North America), an ADIZ named ADIZ
 Air Defense Identification Zone (East China Sea), an ADIZ named ADIZ

See also

 
 Addis (disambiguation)
 Adis (disambiguation)